Elections were held in the Australian state of Victoria on Thursday 5 June 1919 to elect 17 of the 34 members of the state's Legislative Council.

Results

Legislative Council

|}

Retiring Members

Nationalist
Sir John Davies MLC (Melbourne)
Duncan McBryde MLC (South Eastern)

Candidates
Sitting members are shown in bold text. Successful candidates are highlighted in the relevant colour. Where there is possible confusion, an asterisk (*) is also used.

A by-election for Melbourne North, to fill the vacancy caused by Donald Melville's death, was held concurrently with this election and is shown below.

See also
1920 Victorian state election

References

1919 elections in Australia
Elections in Victoria (Australia)
Results of Victorian state elections
1910s in Victoria (Australia)
June 1919 events